Roger Brugué Ayguade (born 4 November 1996), commonly known as Brugui, is a Spanish professional footballer who plays for Levante UD. Mainly a winger, he can also play as a wing-back.

Club career
Born in Bàscara, Girona, Catalonia, Brugui was a UE Figueres youth graduate. On 14 December 2014, aged 18, he made his first team debut by coming on as a second-half substitute in a 0–2 Tercera División home loss against Palamós CF. He scored his first goal the following 26 April, netting his team's second in a 2–4 home loss against FC Vilafranca.

On 19 May 2016, Brugui renewed his contract with the club. On 13 July, however, he joined Gimnàstic de Tarragona, being initially assigned to the farm team also in the fourth division.

Brugui made his first team debut on 28 October 2017, coming on as a late substitute for Maikel Mesa in a 0–1 away loss against CD Lugo in the Segunda División. The following 12 January, he renewed his contract until 2020.

On 1 July 2021, free agent Brugui moved straight to La Liga, after agreeing to a four-year deal with Levante UD, but was loaned to CD Mirandés in the second division on 12 August.

References

External links

1996 births
Living people
People from Alt Empordà
Sportspeople from the Province of Girona
Spanish footballers
Footballers from Catalonia
Association football wingers
Segunda División players
Segunda División B players
Tercera División players
UE Figueres footballers
CF Pobla de Mafumet footballers
Gimnàstic de Tarragona footballers
Levante UD footballers
CD Mirandés footballers